Ulrich von Gutenburg (or Gutenberg; fl. late 12th century) was an Alsatian nobleman and Middle High German poet. He can be traced at the court of Emperors Frederick Barbarossa and Henry VI between 1172 and about 1200. The main influence on his poetry was Friedrich von Hausen, whom he may have known personally. His style is highly formal and he is represented in the chansonniers by a lyric poem of six stanzas in the Minnesang tradition and a similarly themed long poem of 350 verses.

His long poem is a Leich and may be the earliest secular example of its kind in German. Both his known works explore unrequited love, but whereas the lyric verses portray a lady's love as ennobling and educative, the Leich is an expression of feelings of  hopelessness. In the lyric, the knight earns the lady's love by becoming a better person. In the Leich the knight pleads with the lady for mercy by appealing to her greater virtue.

Notes

Sources

External links

Alsatian nobility
12th-century German poets
German male poets
Minnesingers